The Stranger is a 2021 Palestinian drama film directed by Ameer Fakher Eldin. It was selected as the Palestinian entry for the Best International Feature Film at the 94th Academy Awards.

Plot
In occupied Golan Heights, a former doctor experiences an existential crisis before meeting a mysterious soldier.

Cast
 Ashraf Barhom as Adnan
 Mohammad Bakri as Abu Adnan

See also
 List of submissions to the 94th Academy Awards for Best International Feature Film
 List of Palestinian submissions for the Academy Award for Best International Feature Film

References

External links
 

2021 films
2021 drama films
Palestinian drama films
2020s Arabic-language films